(roughly "Bite Hard In Your Mind" in Icelandic) is the début EP of Icelander punk/pop group . This was the band's most punk-oriented release and contains five tracks, featuring one in English, "London".

Track listing

Side 1
 ""     – 2:33
 ""   – 2:12
 "" – 2:20

Side 2
 "London"                – 2:14
 ""     – 3:33

Personnel
                – lead vocals, keyboards
                       – vocals
     – bass
       – guitar
  – drums
           – composition, lyrics

Additional personnel
 Recording engineer: Tony Cook
 Album:  
 Photography:

External links
  at Discogs

Tappi Tíkarrass albums
1982 EPs
Icelandic-language albums